Zawisza Bydgoszcz are a Polish Football club which are based in Bydgoszcz. During the 2013/14 campaign they will compete in the  Ekstraklasa and Polish Cup.

Ekstraklasa

League table

Polish Cup

Sources

Zawisza Bydgoszcz
Zawisza Bydgoszcz seasons